HMS Maria (or Marie) was the French privateer schooner Constance (or Constanza) that the Royal Navy captured in 1805 and that foundered in 1807. During her brief career in the Leeward Islands she participated in the capture of five small prizes.

Capture

On 21 June 1805, Circe captured the privateer Constance in the Leeward Islands. Constance was armed with 10 guns and had a crew of 75 men. She was just out of Guadeloupe. However, she may have been the same Constance that Circe had earlier captured off the coast of Spain.

Service

The Admiralty registered her on 10 November and purchased her on 2 December. The Admiralty named her Maria and she was commissioned under Lieutenant John Henderson.

On 9 June 1806 Maria was in company with a small squadron that also included , Africaine, Circe, and  when they captured the brig Hiram. At the time, Maria was under the command of Lieutenant James Fitzpatrick, apparently temporarily.

, the sloop , and Maria shared in the capture of Jane, Collins, master, on 25 June 1807.

On 26 July 1807, His Majesty's schooners Maria, under Henderson's command, and  captured the schooner Atlantic. On 2 August, Maria was in company with Pert when they captured the schooner Governor MKean. Then on 4 October, Maria was in company with Jason, Hart, and Pert when they captured the schooner Rebecca. However the prize money for these vessels arrived in 1809, too late to be of much use to Marias crew.

Fate
Maria was under Henderson's command when she foundered during a hurricane among the Leeward Islands on 16 October 1807. There were no survivors. On the same day a storm wrecked Pert on the coast of present-day Venezuela.

Notes

Citations

References
 
 

 

1800s ships
Maritime incidents in 1807
Schooners of the Royal Navy
Privateer ships of France
Captured ships
Ships lost with all hands
Shipwrecks in the Caribbean Sea